Sarah Story (born in Carlisle) is a British DJ and radio presenter. She is best known for presenting Radio 1's Future Dance. Before then, she was a DJ for Capital's Weekender.

Early life
Story grew up in Dalston, just outside Carlisle.

Career 
Story started her broadcasting career at the age of 14, doing work experience at CFM, leading to her co-hosting the station's Saturday morning breakfast show. She has presented numerous shows on the Capital network, including the breakfast and drive-time slots, as well as co-hosting the Capital Weekender with Ministry of Sound (22:00, Friday/Saturday to 06:00, Saturday/Sunday).

As part of BBC Radio 1's guest-presenter takeover over the Christmas and New Year period, Story hosted Radio 1's Dance Party on BBC Radio 1 on 1 January 2021. Following the announcement on 20 April that Annie Mac would be leaving the station in July, it was announced that Story would become the new presenter of Radio 1's Future Dance (Fridays, 20:00 to 22:00), filling the slot vacated by Danny Howard, who would replace Mac on Radio 1's Dance Party.

References

External links
Radio 1's Future Dance with Sarah Story (BBC Radio 1)
Future Dance Mix with Sarah Story (BBC Radio 1)

British radio presenters
BBC Radio 1 presenters
Living people
People from Carlisle, Cumbria
British women radio presenters
English women DJs
1989 births